The old Philippine National Bank (PNB) Building was a former office building along Escolta Street in Manila, Philippines.

History
The PNB Building was constructed from 1962 to 1965 and was inaugurated in 1966 by its namesake and tenant, the then-state owned Philippine National Bank (PNB). PNB occupied the building until 1996 when the banking firm was privatized. The PNB moved office to Pasay. The PNB was the main government finance body prior to the establishment of the Bangko Sentral ng Pilipinas, the Philippines' central bank. It then housed the City College of Manila before it was abandoned.

In January 2015, the building sustained damages from a fire which lead to the owner of the building, the Manila City Government to demolish the building.

Architecture and design
The architect of the PNB Bank is Carlos Arguelles with David Consunji as the building's contractor. The architectural style of the building is considered to be that of the International Style which is described to have complemented the climate and context of its immediate vicinity, the Escolta area, according to architect Dominic Galicia, president of the Philippine office of the International Council on Monuments and Sites. The building is 12-storeys high.

Demolition
Following the 2015 fire, the Manila City Government under the administration of Manila Mayor Joseph Estrada decided to demolish the building after it deemed the building structurally unsound. The building's demolition was earlier proposed in 2010 under Estrada's predecessor Alfredo Lim after Romy Lorenzo of Geltd Developers and Managers Group Inc., a developer claimed that the PNB Building is at a risk of collapse should an earthquake strike the city. The demolition was condemned by heritage conservationists, since the PNB Building is presumed to be an Important Cultural Property under the National Cultural Heritage Act and has suggested to retrofit the building instead.

References

Buildings and structures in Binondo
Former buildings and structures in Manila
Buildings and structures completed in 1965